Child Genius is an Australian reality competition series, hosted by Susan Carland and broadcast on SBS. The show involves a group of gifted children completing a series of tasks to gain the title of child genius. Gifted consultant and Chairman of Mensa International's Gifted Youth Committee Alan D. Thompson appeared for Australian Mensa.

References

2018 Australian television series debuts
2010s Australian game shows
English-language television shows
Special Broadcasting Service original programming
Television series about children
Television shows set in Sydney